HMS Abbotsham was one of 93 ships of the Ham class of inshore minesweepers.

Their names were all chosen from villages ending in -ham. The minesweeper was named after Abbotsham in Devon. Abbotsham was one of the third series of Ham-class minesweepers, with an all-wooden hull, and was built by William Blackmore, completing on 10 January 1957.

The Ham class proved to be too small to carry modern minesweeping gear, and like many of the class, Abbotsham was quickly placed in operational reserve, entering this state in November 1957. She remained in operational reserve at Rosneath until 1966, when she was placed on the disposal list, the ship being sold in 1967.

See also
List of ship names of the Royal Navy

References

Bibliography
Blackman, R.V.B. ed. Jane's Fighting Ships (1953)

External links
Details at the Ton-class Association site

 

Ham-class minesweepers
1955 ships